Venable is an extinct town in Warren County, Ohio.

History
The community was named in 1856 after William Venable.

References

Ghost towns in Ohio
Landforms of Warren County, Ohio